Among the books considered to be revealed by God in the Quran, the three mentioned by name are the Tawrat (Torah) revealed to Musa (Moses), the Zabur (Psalms) revealed to Dawud (David), and the Injil (Gospel) revealed to Isa (Jesus). The Quran mentions the Torah, Psalms, and Gospel as being revealed by God in the same way the Quran was revealed to Muhammad, the final prophet and messenger of God according to Muslims.

Muslim religious authorities view these books (i.e., the Bible, or parts of it) as having been altered and interpolated over time, while maintaining that the Quran remains as the final, unchanged and preserved word of God.

Quran
The term "Bible" is not found in the Quran; instead the Quran refers to specific books of the Bible, including Torah, Psalms and Gospel.

Sources 
References to the Bible, in the modern sense, are often fragmentary, since Muslims do not refer to the biblical canon of Chalcedonian churches. First references to the biblical canon can be found since the 9th century onwards, in Muslim writings. Ibn Qutaybah ( 889) included a translation of the Genesis 1–3. Imam al-Qasim ibn Ibrahim (860) included a large portion of the Book of Matthew in his Refutation of Christians. Most Christians Muslims encountered in early years have been Nestorians, Melkites and Jacobites. Ubayy ibn Ka'b, a Jewish convert, referred to a story of the Torah which is absent in today's canon.

Torah

The Quran mentions the word  (Torah) eighteen times, and confirms that it was the word of God. However, some Muslims also believe that there were additions and subtractions in the Torah, according to their interpretation of a verse of the Quran Surat Al-Baqarah verse 79 which, although does not mention the word Torah, says: "Woe to those who write the book with their own hands in exchange for a small amount of money, woe to them by what their hands have written and Woe to them from what they were doing". However, another early quranic exegete called Al-Tabari referred to the Jewish Torah in his words as "the Torah that they possess today".

Psalms 

Surah An-Nisa 4:163 of the Quran states: "and to David We gave the Zabur". Therefore, Islam affirms that the Zabur attributed to David, in which is called the Book of Psalms were inspired by God. The Quran mentions the word  three times (Quran 17:55; 21:105).

Gospel 

When the Quran speaks of the Gospel, Muslims believe it refers to a single volume book called "The Gospel of Jesus": supposedly an original divine revelation to Jesus Christ. Accordingly, Muslim scholars reject the Christian canonical Gospels, which they say are not the original teachings of Jesus and which they say have been corrupted over time.  Some scholars have suggested that the original Gospel may be the Gospel of Barnabas.

Muhammad and the Bible

Deuteronomy 18:18 

Deuteronomy 18:18 has often been considered a prophecy of the coming of Muhammad by Muslim scholars. Al-Samawal al-Maghribi, a medieval Jewish mathematician who converted to Islam, pointed to Deuteronomy 18:18 in his book Confutation of the Jews as a prophecy fulfilled by the appearance of Muhammad. Samawal argued in his book that since the children of Esau are described in Deuteronomy 2:4–6 and Numbers 20:14 as the brethren of the children of Israel, the children of Ishmael can also be described the same way. Some Muslim writers, like Muhammad Ali and Fethullah Gülen, have interpreted several verses in the Quran as implying that Muhammad was alluded to in Deuteronomy 18:18, including Quran 46:10 and 73:15.

Christians interpret Deuteronomy 18:18 as referring to a future member of the community of Israel who re-enacts the function of Moses, serving as a mediator for the covenant between Yahweh and the Israelites. Walter Brueggemann writes that "The primary requirement for the prophet, like the king in 17:15, is that he or she must be a member of Israel, thoroughly situated in the traditions and claims of the Yahwistic covenant." The Gospels of Matthew and John both present Jesus as being the "prophet like Moses" from Deuteronomy 18 and Acts 3:15–23 states that Jesus is the one Moses was talking about in Deuteronomy 18:18.

Paraclete 

The Paraclete, or Advocate, is mentioned five times in the Gospel of John. The Advocate, called the "Spirit of truth", is considered to be the Holy Spirit; a replacement for Jesus into the world after Jesus leaves. John says that the world cannot receive the Spirit, although the Spirit abides with and in the disciples (14:17). The Spirit will convict the world of sin (16:8–9) and glorify Jesus (16:13–14).

Biblical people in Islam 

Some of the people revered or mentioned in both the Quran and the Bible include: Aaron, Abel, Abraham, Adam, Cain, David, the disciples of Jesus, Elias, Elisha, Enoch, Eve, Ezra, Goliath, Isaac, Ishmael, Jacob, Jesus, John the Baptist, Jonah, Joseph, Lot, Mary, Moses, Noah, the Pharaohs of Egypt, Samuel, Saul, Solomon, and Zachariah.

See also 
 Biblical criticism
 Christianity and Islam
 Isra'iliyat
 Jesus in Islam
 The Messiah
 Tahrif

References 

Bible-related controversies
Christianity and Islam
Islam and Judaism
Bible
Islam-related controversies